is a passenger railway station located in the city of Hikone, Shiga, Japan, operated by the West Japan Railway Company (JR West).

Lines

Station layout
The station consists of two opposed side platforms connected by an elevated station building. The station building has a Midori no Madoguchi staffed ticket office.

Platform

History
The station opened on 30 June 1981.

Station numbering was introduced in March 2018 with Minami-Hikone being assigned station number JR-A14.

Passenger statistics
In fiscal 2019, the station was used by an average of 5901 passengers daily (boarding passengers only).

Surrounding area
Hikone Regional Joint Government Building
 Labor Welfare Center
Hikone Driving School

See also
List of railway stations in Japan

References

External links

JR West official home page

Railway stations in Japan opened in 1981
Railway stations in Shiga Prefecture
Tōkaidō Main Line
Hikone, Shiga